Sosthenis was a town in Oetaea in ancient Thessaly.

Modern scholars tentatively locate Sosthenis at the modern site of Vardates.

References

Populated places in ancient Thessaly
Former populated places in Greece
Oetaea